The International Engine of the Year is an annual competition for automotive industry internal combustion engines and electric motors, judged by a panel of automobile journalists from around the world.  It is organised by UKi Media & Events' Automotive Magazines.  The competition was started in 1999.

The award is determined by the panellists using "subjective driving impressions and technical knowledge, and took into account characteristics such as fuel economy, noise, smoothness, performance and driveability".

Annual winners

Old categories

Rankings
Number of times the following makes have received the award:

See also

 List of motor vehicle awards
Ward's 10 Best Engines
PACE Award
World Car of the Year
International Car of the Year
Autobest

References

External links
International Engine of the Year Awards homepage

Automobile engines
British science and technology awards
Lists of automobile engines
Motor vehicle awards